HMS Rifleman was a turbine-powered  of the Royal Navy.  She was launched in 1943 and saw active service during World War II, both in the European and Far East theatres.  After the war she served in the Mediterranean and was used as an accommodation ship in Barrow before being sold for breaking in 1972.

Design and description
The ships' complement consisted of 85 officers and ratings.

The ships had two Parsons geared steam turbines,, each driving one shaft, using steam provided by two Admiralty three-drum boilers.

The Algerine class was armed with a QF  Mk V anti-aircraft gun and four twin-gun mounts for Oerlikon 20 mm cannon. The latter guns were in short supply when the first ships were being completed and they often got a proportion of single mounts. By 1944, single-barrel Bofors 40 mm mounts began replacing the twin 20 mm mounts on a one for one basis. All of the ships were fitted for four throwers and two rails for depth charges.

Construction
The ship was launched from the Harland and Wolff yard in Belfast on 25 November 1943 and  commissioned on 11 February 1944.

History

World War II
From June to August 1944 Rifleman was engaged in minesweeping and escort duties for Operation Neptune, the Allied invasion of Normandy.  In September she was nominated for Air Sea Rescue duties during the Arnhem airborne assault, and in October she carried out mine clearance operations in the Scheldt estuary and escorted a military convoy to Antwerp.

She was transferred to the South West Approaches with the rest of her Flotilla and was employed in anti-submarine patrols out of Falmouth until December, when she was refitted for service in the Far East.

In February 1945 Rifleman rejoined her Flotilla and together they formed the escort for a convoy of Landing Ships (Tank) from Falmouth to Gibraltar. Rifleman arrived at Colombo on 14 April and on 1 May she began minesweeping the approaches to Rangoon for the assault ships. This operation was named Livery.

In September, the minesweeper performed the same task in the Malacca Straits prior to the entry into Singapore.

Post-war
The minesweeper remained in the Far East with her Flotilla to remove mines for the safety of navigation, returning of the UK in July 1946. She was paid off at Sheerness in September 1946, reduced to Reserve and laid up.

Rifleman was recommissioned into the 2nd Minesweeping Flotilla of the Mediterranean Fleet after refit in 1947. In 1953 the vessel took part in the Fleet Review to celebrate the Coronation of Queen Elizabeth II. At the end of 1954 she returned to the UK and was again reduced to Reserve and laid up. During 1958 and 1959 she was refitted. In 1970 the ship was sent to Barrow and used to provide accommodation, including for personnel standing by submarines under construction by Vickers-Armstrong.

Fate
She was placed on the Disposal List in 1972 and sold to BISCO for breaking by W H Arnott Young at Dalmuir.

References

Publications

External links
HMSRifleman at naval.history.net
  HMS Rifleman at naval.history.net
 HMS  Rifleman at battleships-cruisers.co.uk

   

Algerine-class minesweepers of the Royal Navy
Ships built in Belfast
1943 ships
World War II minesweepers of the United Kingdom
World War II escort ships of the United Kingdom
Ships built by Harland and Wolff